3,4-Dihydropyran (DHP) is a heterocyclic compound with the formula C5H8O. The six-membered C5O ring has the unsaturation adjacent to oxygen. The isomeric 3,6-dihydropyran has a methylene separating the double bond and oxygen.  DHP is used for protecting group for alcohols.  It is a colorless liquid.

Preparation
Dihydropyran is prepared by the dehydration of tetrahydrofurfuryl alcohol over alumina at 300–400 °C.  THFA is itself prepared from tetrahydro-2-furoic acid.

Reactions
In organic synthesis, the 2-tetrahydropyranyl (THP) group is used as a protecting group for alcohols.  Reaction of the alcohol with DHP forms a THP ether, protecting the alcohol from a variety of reactions.  The alcohol can later be restored by acidic hydrolysis, concomitant with formation of 5-hydroxypentanal.

See also 
Pyran
Tetrahydropyran

References

Dihydropyrans